Thomas Estcourt may refer to:
Sir Thomas Estcourt (died 1624) (c. 1570–1624), English lawyer, member of parliament (MP) for Malmesbury and for Gloucestershire
Sir Thomas Estcourt (died 1702), English lawyer, MP for Malmesbury, and for Bath
Thomas Estcourt Cresswell (1712–1788), son-in-law of the above, English merchant, MP for Wootton Bassett
Thomas Estcourt (died 1818), English landowner, MP for Cricklade
Thomas Grimston Estcourt (1775–1853), son of the above, English landowner, MP for Devizes and for Oxford University

See also
Thomas Sotheron-Estcourt (disambiguation)